Codex iconographicus monacensis 236 (BSB cod. icon. 326) is an armorial of the coats of arms of the attendants of the imperial diet of 1594 at Regensburg (formerly Regensburg city library, Rat. civ. 252)
Rudolf II in 1594 declared Regensburg would be the sole location where imperial diets were to be held in the future.

The codex consists of paper folia measuring 22.5⨯16 cm with 48 non-empty pages. It contains a total of 84 coats of arms, mostly the personal or family arms of princes, with some clerical arms and ten city arms.
The coats of arms are arranged by the accommodation of the bearers in Regensburg's eight city districts (Wachten).

1r Frederick I, Duke of Württemberg
5v Philipe de Croÿ, Duke of Aerschot 
 6r – 12v Ostner Wacht  
 13r – 15v Wildwercher Wacht
16r – 21v Wittwanger Wacht
 22r – 24r Westner Wacht
 25r – 37r Scherer Wacht
25r Archbishop-Elector of Mainz Wolfgang von Dalberg
 38r – 44v Quartier in der Pauluser Wacht
 42v John Casimir, Duke of Saxe-Coburg
 44r Johann Georg, Prince of Hohenzollern-Hechingen 
 44v Philipp Ludwig II, Count of Hanau-Münzenberg
45r – 47v  Donauwacht 
45r Christian IV of Denmark
47v arms of the city of Nördlingen represented by city councillor Thomas Dithey und advocate Sebastian Rattinger 
 48r Wahlenwacht; arms of the duke  of  Braunschweig-Lüneburg

References
 
  Peter Fleischmann, Kurtze und eigentliche Beschreibung des zu Regensburg in diesem 94. Jar gehaltenen Reichstag,  Wurster, Regensburg, 1594.
 C. Joist,  M. Kamp, 'Der Einzug Rudolfs II. 1594', in: Feste in Regensburg ed.  K. Möseneder, Regensburg 1986, pp. 145-152.
A. Schmid, Regensburg. Historischer Atlas von Bayern, Teil Altbayern 60. München 1995.
W. Schulze, 'Augsburg und die Reichstage im späten 16. Jahrhundert', in: Welt im Umbruch  
Karl Bauer, Regensburg, 5th ed. Regensburg, 1997.

External links

Marianne Reuter, Beschreibung der Handschrift Cod.icon. 326, in:  BSB-CodIcon Online (2010).
digital images

Heraldry of the Holy Roman Empire
1594 books
 
1594 in the Holy Roman Empire
Rolls of arms